Dirk Steffen Schuebel (born 1965) is a diplomat and economist from Germany. He serves in the European External Action Service (EEAS)  as the Head of the Delegation of the European Union to Belarus since 2019. Previously he has been the Head of the Delegation of the European Union to Moldova from November 2009 until mid 2013.

Biography
Dirk Schuebel was born in East Germany. From Brussels he worked with Hungary (helped to bring it into the European Union as political desk officer for Hungary). Dirk Schuebel has served as Head of Political, Press and Information Section and Acting Head of the Delegation of the European Commission to Ukraine.

Ambassador Dirk Schuebel was the second head of the Delegation of the European Union to Moldova after Cesare de Montis Schuebel has been the Head of the Delegation of the European Union to Moldova from November 2009 til mid 2013. He then moved on to work in the EEAS Head Office. Since late summer 2019 he is the Head of the Delegation of the European Union to Belarus

References

External links 
 Dirk Schuebel
 Dirk Schuebel: Moldova's hard times give possibilities for fiscal reforms
 Dirk Schuebel recommends to improve customs services

German diplomats
Ambassadors of the European Union to Moldova
Ambassadors of the European Union to Belarus
1965 births
Living people
Recipients of the Order of Honour (Moldova)
German officials of the European Union